Ismael Íñiguez González (born 23 July 1981) is a Mexican former footballer who played as an attacking midfielder and winger.

He was part of the Mexico 2004 Olympic football team, who were eliminated in the first round, having finished third in group A, below group winners Mali and South Korea.

Honours
UNAM
Mexican Primera División: Clausura 2004, Apertura 2004, Clausura 2009

Mexico Youth
Central American and Caribbean Games: Silver Medal 2002
CONCACAF Olympic Qualifying Championship: 2004

External links
 

1981 births
Living people
Club Universidad Nacional footballers
Atlético Morelia players
Club Necaxa footballers
Club Tijuana footballers
Lobos BUAP footballers
Correcaminos UAT footballers
Liga MX players
Footballers from Jalisco
People from Ocotlán, Jalisco
Olympic footballers of Mexico
Footballers at the 2004 Summer Olympics
Association football midfielders
Central American and Caribbean Games silver medalists for Mexico
Competitors at the 2002 Central American and Caribbean Games
Atlante F.C. non-playing staff
Central American and Caribbean Games medalists in football
Mexican footballers